Monica Babuc (born 29 March 1964) is a politician and historian from the Republic of Moldova, who was Minister of Culture of the Republic of Moldova in four consecutive cabinets (Leancă, Gaburici, Streleţ and Filip) from 2013 to 2019.

Monica Babuc is a member of the Democratic Party of Moldova, and formerly a member of the Christian Democratic People's Party.

In May 2015 she submitted his candidacy for the mayoralty of Chișinău. In the televised electoral debates, she admitted that she speaks Romanian and is equally Romanian and Moldovan, contrary to the position and ideology of the DPM leaders, Marian Lupu and Dumitru Diacov, who declare that they speak Moldovan and that they are Moldovans and not Romanian. At the local elections in Chisinau on 14 June 2015 Monica Babuc accrued 2.17% of the vote.

Family
She is married and has a child. She speaks Russian, French and English.

References

External links 
 Monica Babuc at the Moldovan Government's website

1964 births
Living people
People from Ialoveni District
Democratic Party of Moldova politicians
Government ministers of Moldova
Moldovan Ministers of Education
Culture ministers of Moldova
Women government ministers of Moldova
21st-century Moldovan women politicians